Borislav Dimitrov (Bulgarian: Борислав Димитров; born 29 September 1979) is a Bulgarian former professional footballer who played as a forward. He played his last match in 2007 at age 28 due to an injury which forced his retirement.

References

External links
 Player Profile at levskisofia.info

1979 births
Living people
Bulgarian footballers
Association football forwards
Botev Plovdiv players
PFC Levski Sofia players
PFC Marek Dupnitsa players
PFC Rodopa Smolyan players
FC Maritsa Plovdiv players
First Professional Football League (Bulgaria) players
Second Professional Football League (Bulgaria) players